Eagle in Christianity may refer to:

 Eagle lectern, especially in Anglican churches
 John the Evangelist, symbolised by an eagle
 The eagle in the Bible: List of animals in the Bible § E